Inbar Lanir (born 3 April 2000) is an Israeli Olympic judoka. She competes in the under 78 kg weight category, and won a bronze medals in the 2021 Tashkent Grand Slam and the 2021 Tbilisi Grand Slam.

Lanir has won the 2020 European U23 Championships and placed 3rd in the 2019 European U23 Championships and in the 2019 European U21 Championships.

In the 2021 World Judo Championships, Lanir placed 7th after winning her first two matches, losing in the quarterfinal and the repechage.

Lanir represented Israel at the 2020 Summer Olympics, competing at the women's 78 kg weight category. In her first match, she beat Mongolian Otgony Mönkhtsetseg with an 18 seconds ippon. In the round of 16, she lost to the Brazilian former two-time world champion, Mayra Aguiar, ending her part in the individual competition.

In 2022, she won one of the bronze medals in her event at the Judo Grand Prix Almada held in Almada, Portugal, and three silver medals at Grand Slam Ulaanbaatar, Grand Slam Budapest and Grand Prix Zagreb.

Titles
Source:

References

External links

 
 
 Inbar Lanir at the European Judo Union
 

2000 births
Living people
Israeli female judoka
Jewish martial artists
Jewish Israeli sportspeople
Judoka at the 2020 Summer Olympics
Olympic judoka of Israel
Medalists at the 2020 Summer Olympics
Olympic medalists in judo
Olympic bronze medalists for Israel
21st-century Israeli women